Dickeys is an unincorporated community in Kankakee County, in the U.S. state of Illinois.

The community was named for Sylvester Dickey, an early settler.

References

Unincorporated communities in Kankakee County, Illinois
Unincorporated communities in Illinois